North from the Lone Star is a 1941 American Western film directed by Lambert Hillyer and written by Charles F. Royal. The film stars Wild Bill Elliott, Richard Fiske, Dorothy Fay, Dub Taylor, Arthur Loft and Jack Roper. The film was released on March 31, 1941, by Columbia Pictures.

Plot

Cast          
Wild Bill Elliott as Wild Bill Hickok
Richard Fiske as Clint Wilson
Dorothy Fay as Madge Wilson
Dub Taylor as Cannonball
Arthur Loft as 'Flash' Kirby
Jack Roper as 'Rawhide' Fenton
Chuck Morrison as Spike
Claire Rochelle as Lucy Belle
Al Rhein as Slats
Edmund Cobb as Dusty Daggett

References

External links
 

1941 films
American Western (genre) films
1941 Western (genre) films
Columbia Pictures films
Films directed by Lambert Hillyer
American black-and-white films
1940s English-language films
1940s American films